The General Staff Department (GSD) of the Korean People's Army (KPA) is the senior military leadership of the armed forces of North Korea responsible for its administrative, operational and logistical needs. The current Chief of the General Staff is Army General Park Su-il.

Duties
The GSD is the principal administrative body of the KPA besides the Ministry of Defense, which gives it the authority to do the following: 

 Plan the national defense policy for the KPA
 Assess threats to the sovereignty and security of the state
 Regulate the training, education, and organization of the KPA

Chiefs of the General Staff of the Korean People's Army

See also
Ministry of Defence (North Korea)

References

External links
VMar Ri Yong Ho, Gen. Kim Kyok Sik, Kim Yong Chun at the North Korea Leadership Watch
Kim Jong-un promotes senior military officials

Military of North Korea
Korea, North